Arctia brachyptera, the Kluane tiger moth, is a moth of the family Erebidae. It was described by James T. Troubridge and J. Donald Lafontaine in 2000 and is only known from the Yukon in Canada. It occurs in alpine tundra of the Saint Elias Mountains.

References

Moths described in 2000
Arctiina
Moths of North America